Thermus antranikianii is a bacterium belonging to the Deinococcota phylum, known to be present in hazardous conditions. This species was identified in Iceland, together with Thermus igniterrae.

References

External links
Type strain of Thermus antranikianii at BacDive -  the Bacterial Diversity Metadatabase

Deinococcota
Bacteria described in 2000